= Thomas M. Marchant III =

American politician

Thomas Mood Marchant III

Member of the South Carolina House of Representatives from the 20th district
- In office 1972–1986

Personal details
- Born: October 19, 1940 (age 85) Greenville, South Carolina
- Party: Republican

Thomas Mood Marchant III (born October 19, 1940) was an American politician in the state of South Carolina. He served in the South Carolina House of Representatives as a member of the Republican Party from 1972 to 1986, representing Greenville County, South Carolina. He was Director of Special Projects at a local manufacturing company.
